Stonewall Peak is a prominent mountain located in San Diego County within Cuyamaca Rancho State Park. It is east of the city of San Diego and south of Julian.

The summit is accessible from Paso Picacho Campground, which is accessed by California State Route 79. Parking is also available for $10. The Hike can be done as an out and back going up the West side of Stonewall Peak which is about 4 miles round trip, or it can be a loop going up the West side and down the North side which will wind back to Paso Picacho Campground for a total of just over 5 miles.

History 
Stonewall Peak was named after Stonewall Mine which was between Stonewall Peak and Lake Cuyamaca. The mine was originally named Stonewall Jackson Mine, after Confederate general Stonewall Jackson, and was founded in 1870. The mine was one of the richest in all of San Diego. Anti-Southern sentiments eventually led to the name being shortened to Stonewall Mine.

The peak's original Kumeyaay name was Cushi-Pi, meaning "Sharp Peak". There are efforts to change the peak's official name to this.

References

Mountains of San Diego County, California
Mountains of Southern California